Asoda is a village in Jalgaon District, Maharashtra state in western India, located on the northern Deccan Plateau. The main occupation of people in Asoda is farming of cotton, black gram, green gram.

Geography
Its geographical coordinates are 21° 2' 0" North, 75° 36' 0" East. Asoda is surrounded by Jalgaon, Bhadli, Mamurabad and Tarsod.

Demographics
 India census, Asoda had a population of 10,000. Males constitute 52% of the population and females 48%.

Transport
Most people depend on public transport MSRTC, commonly known as "ST", and private vehicles like auto-rickshaw for commuting to district and taluka places like Jalgaon & Bhusawal.

References

Villages in Jalgaon district